"Celebrity" is a song by South Korean singer-songwriter IU. It was released on January 27, 2021, through EDAM Entertainment via Kakao M, and serves as the lead single from her fifth Korean-language studio album, Lilac. A dance-pop and electropop track, "Celebrity" was written by IU, with additional composition by Chloe Latimer and Celine Svanback, and Ryan S. Jhun, Jeppe London Bilsby, Lauritz Emil Christiansen, —the last three also handled arrangement.

Background
IU first teased that a new single was in the works while onstage at the 35th Golden Disc Awards on January 9, 2021. As she accepted the Digital Daesang award for "Blueming", she stated that the new song would be "refreshing" and "gives people strength". On January 11, her label, Edam Entertainment, announced that she would return with a pre-release single titled "Celebrity" on January 27, 2021. The label hinted that the new song would be a cheerful pop sound with energetic music genre.

"Celebrity" was subsequently released on January 27 for digital download and streaming as the lead single off of IU's fifth Korean-language studio album, Lilac. The single marked her first offering following the release of the chart-topping single "Eight"—a collaboration with BTS' Suga—in May 2020. The track was written and composed by IU, Ryan S. Jhun, Jeppe London Bilsby, Lauritz Emil Christiansen, Chloe Latimer and Celine Svanback, with arrangement conducted by Bilsby, Christiansen and Jhun.

Composition
Musically, "Celebrity" is described as a dance-pop track that incorporates a variety of genres, including pop, electronic music and tropical house, and signals a shift from much of IU's previous discography. Regarding the musicality of the single, EDAM Entertainment stated that "the song has a bright and cheerful pop sound that can energize those listening to it. It's a genre of music that IU is trying for the first time". Furthermore, the agency commented about the upcoming album's musical direction, saying "it will be her venture into more energetic and pop beat genres". Lyrically, the song explores the themes of fame, identity, insecurities, loss and the notion of living as a celebrity.

Commercial performance
Upon release, "Celebrity" debuted atop the Gaon Digital Chart, becoming IU's 17th number one single and 25th number-one overall when including featured appearances and OSTs. The song remained atop the chart for six consecutive weeks, becoming one of the longest songs in the chart's history to remain at number one. Internationally, "Celebrity" debuted and peaked at number 2 and number 13 in Singapore and New Zealand respectively. The song placed at number 3 in its opening week on the World Digital Song Sales chart, where it peaked. On the Billboard Global Excl. US chart, the song debuted at number 190 before entering at number 78 on the standard Billboard Global 200 the following week, marking her first appearance on the global chart.

Music video and promotion 
On January 25, 2021, a music video teaser for "Celebrity" was released on Kakao M's official YouTube channel. The music video, directed by Paranoid Paradigm and produced by VM Project Architecture, was subsequently uploaded on January 27, in conjunction with the release of the single.

Accolades

Credits and personnel
Credits adapted from Melon.

 IU — vocals, lyricist, composer, chorus
 Ryan S. Jhun — composer, arranger
 Jeppe London Bilsby — composer, arranger
 Lauritz Emil Christiansen — composer, arranger
 Chloe Latimer — composer
 Celine Svanback — composer
 Son Myung-gap  — recording 
 Jongpil Koo  — mixing
 Kang Seon-young — assisted
 Jung Yu-ra — assisted

Charts

Weekly charts

Monthly charts

Yearly charts

Certifications

Release history

See also 
 List of Inkigayo Chart winners (2021)
 List of Music Bank Chart winners (2021)
 List of Show Champion Chart winners (2021)
 List of Show! Music Core Chart winners (2021)

References

2021 singles
2021 songs
IU (singer) songs
Songs written by IU (singer)
Korean-language songs
Kakao M singles
Gaon Digital Chart number-one singles
Billboard Korea K-Pop number-one singles
Songs about fame